Ribautia repanda is a species of centipede in the Geophilidae family. It was first described in 1911 by Austrian myriapodologist Carl Attems.

Description
These centipedes can reach 68 mm in length. Males of this species have 75 to 83 pairs of legs; females have 77 to 85 leg pairs.

Distribution
The species occurs in south-west Western Australia as well as in New Caledonia and the Loyalty Islands.

Behaviour
The centipedes are solitary terrestrial predators that inhabit plant litter, soil and rotting wood.

References

 

 
repanda
Centipedes of Australia
Fauna of New Caledonia
Fauna of Western Australia
Animals described in 1911
Taxa named by Carl Attems